José Abílio Osório Soares (2 June 1947 – 17 June 2007) was an Indonesian politician. He was the last governor of the Indonesian province of East Timor before the country's independence.

Profile
During the Indonesian occupation of East Timor, Soares became Mayor of Dili, later Regent (Bupati) of his home of Manatuto and from September 18, 1992, until 1999 the last governor of the province of Timor Timur.  Immediately after taking office, he outraged the world with his statement that "many more should have died" in the Santa Cruz massacre that had taken place shortly before. In May 1994, he proposed an autonomy within Indonesia to resolve the East Timor conflict, which was rejected by the Indonesian President Suharto as unconstitutional. Soares was then sent to Jakarta for four months on a military course, which was to be considered a disciplinary measure.  During Soares' second term in office from September 1997, his involvement in corruption cases in connection with the family-owned company Anak Liambau Group became so massive that the Deputy Governor Suryo Prabowo resigned in protest in 1998. After Suharto's resignation in May 1998, there were heavy demonstrations in East Timor over allegations of corruption against Soares. At the same time, public pressure increased, calling for an independence referendum.

Soares played a key role in building up the Pro-Indonesia militia that swept across the country after the East Timor independence referendum of August 30 and the subsequent destruction of East Timor.  He has also been held directly responsible for some cases, such as the Liquiçá Church massacre of April 6, 1999, massacre in the house of independence leader Manuel Carrascalão of April 17, 1999, in the residence of Bishop Belo on September 6, 1999, and in a Church in Suai on September 6, 1999.  In connection with these cases, he was accused of having done nothing to prevent these crimes. With the intervention of INTERFET and takeover by the United Nations (UNTAET), which later led East Timor to independence, Soares was deposed.

Death
Soares died in Kupang of cancer on 17 June 2007 after being in a coma for four days. Despite East Timorese objections he was given a state hero's funeral by the Indonesian government. Frans Lebu Raya, the deputy governor of East Nusa Tenggara province laid a wreath sent by Indonesian President Susilo Bambang Yudhoyono, who did not personally attend the funeral. Other important dignitaries who attended the funeral included several highly controversial figures from the Indonesian occupation of East Timor, including retired Lt. Gen. Prabowo Subianto, retired Indonesian Major General Zacky Anwar Makarim, former deputy army chief of staff Kiki Syanakri, and West Papua Governor Abraham Octavianus Atururi.

Soares, who was 60 when he died, is survived by his wife, Maria Ângela Correia de Lemos Osório Soares, and their four children, as well as his 86-year-old mother, Beatriz Osório Soares. All of the family members attended the funeral.

Soares was buried in Dharma Loka Heroes' Cemetery in Kupang.

External links and references
 Ex-East Timor governor given hero's burial (accessed on 12 July 2007)
 People's Daily Online:Ex-East Timor governor given hero's burial (accessed on 12 July 2007)
 Trial Watch: Jose Abilio Osorio Soares

References

Indonesian occupation of East Timor
East Timorese politicians
East Timorese people of Portuguese descent
Indonesian Christians
1947 births
2007 deaths
People from Manatuto District
Deaths from cancer in Indonesia
Indonesian Roman Catholics
Indonesian people of Portuguese descent
Indo people